The academic growth of Perintalmanna is best reflected with its number of educational institutions, including the Malappuram Centre of Aligarh Muslim University(established in 2012) at Chelamala.
There is a long list of schools and colleges spread all over Perintalmanna.

List of Colleges in Perinthalmanna

Aligarh Muslim University Malappuram Centre, Perinthalmanna
Alsalama Institute of Architecture, Perinthalmanna 
Pookoya Thangal Memorial Govt. (PTM ) College
Government Polytechnic College, Perinthalmanna, Angadippuram PO
MEA Engineering College, Vengoor P.O, Perinthalmanna
Monti international institute of management studies, Puthanangadi, Perinthalmanna
Mankada Govt College, Moorkkanad - Kolathur Rd

Colleges of Medical Sciences 
Al Salama College of Optometry
M.E.S. Academy of Medical Sciences:  Malaparamba, Perinthalmanna
M.E.S. Medical College
M.E.S. Dental College 
M.E.S. College of Nursing
M.E.S. School of Nursing
M.E.S. Institute of Paramedical Sciences
Shifa Institute of Medical Sciences [Sims]:
Al Shifa College of Paramedical Sciences
Al Shifa College of Pharmacy 
Al Shifa College of Nursing 
Al Shifa School of Nursing
Colleges Under EMS Memorial Co-Operative Hospital & Research Centre:
 EMS College of Paramedical Sciences
 EMS College of Nursing
 EMS School of Nursing
Moulana Institute of Nursing and Paramedical Sciences:
Moulana College of Paramedical Sciences
Moulana College of Nursing
Moulana School of Nursing
Moulana College of Pharmacy

Arts and Science Colleges
AL JAMIA Arts and Science College, Pooppalam
M.E.S. Arts and Science College, Palachode P.O., Perinthalmanna 
MSTM (Muhammad Ali Shihab Thangal Memorial) Arts & Science College, Pooppalam
SNDP Sathabdi Smaraka College, Angadippuram
St Mary's College, Puthanagadi
ISS Arts and Science College, Ponniakurissy
Nasra Arts and Science College, Nusrathul Islam Trust, Thirurkad 
Co-operative Arts & Science College, Perinthalmanna,
GEMS Arts & Science College, Panangagara, Perinthalmanna,
AAMS (Academy for Accounting And Management Studies) Perinthalmanna 
MES Women's College, Perinthalmanna 
Pratibha College, Nh-213 Hwy, Perinthalmanna 
Victory college, Ootty Rd, Perinthalmanna
National Service Society - NSSI (Mission College), Perinthalmanna

Arabic Colleges
Al Jamia Al Islamia - The Islamic University, Santapuram, Perinthalmanna 
Jamia Nooriyya Arabic College, Pattikkad
Shuhadha Islamic College, Puthanangadi
Ilahiya Arabic College, Thirurkad 
Anwarul Islam Arabic College, Thirurkad
Darul Uloom Islamic Da'wa College, Thootha, Perintalmanna
Jamia Al Hind - Sharaiyya College, Cherukara P.O., Perintalmanna
Darul Uloom Islamic & Arts College Wafy Campus, Paral, Thootha, Perintalmanna

Training Institute (TTC Colleges)
Darul Uloom Teacher Training Institute, Thootha, Perinthalmanna
Perfect Teachers Training Institute, Perinthalmanna
ISS College of Teacher Education, Ponniakurissy, Perinthalmanna

Technical institutes
Etudemy Digital Academy, Perinthalmanna 
Govt. ITI (SCDD), Pathaikkara, Perinthalmanna
Cubatic College of Interior Designing, Perinthalmanna
NTC College of Engineering (NTC Technical Institute), Perinthalmanna
Anwar ITI (Industrial Training Institute-Run by: Thanveerul Islam Association), Tirurkad
Hamad ITC, Thirurkad, Perinthalmanna
Perfect ITC & College, (Run by Al-Kamil Charitable Trust), Perinthalmanna
Al-Kamil ITI & Institute of Technology, Ooty Rd, Perinthalmanna
Al-Kamil Institute of Fire And Safety
Malabar Institute of Technology, Thazhe Pooppalam
Electro ITC-Industrial Training Institute, Near KC, Perinthalmanna
Electro Technical centre(ETC) - Vocational Training centre, Pattambi Road
Food Craft Institute, Angadipuram (Jointly sponsored by Government of India and Government of Kerala)
Akbar Academy of Airline Studies
Vision School of Aviation - Aviation training institute in Perintalmanna
Areena Animation Academy
NIFE Academy and Countless Technology Institutions for various Genres.

List of CBSE Affiliated Schools in Perinthalmanna
PES Global School (Parakkottil English School), Perintalmanna, Puzhakkattiri, affiliated to CBSE 931163, contact-8593060650
Silvermount International School- The only international school of perinthalmanna, now affiliated to CBSE. 
I.S.S. English Medium Senior Secondary School:
St. Joseph's E.M. Senior Secondary School, Puthanangadi - Perinthalmanna
Sree Valluvanad Vidya Bhavan, Eravimangalam - Perinthalmanna
Darul Falah English School, Poopalam -  affiliated to the CBSE,
M.E.S. Central School, Perinthalmanna
M.J. Academy, Panambi

List of Schools in Perinthalmanna

Govt. Model Higher Secondary School, Perinthalmanna
Govt. Girls Higher Secondary School, Perinthalmanna
Govt. Vocational Higher Secondary School, Perinthalmanna
IHRD - Technical Higher Secondary School, Perithalmanna
Presentation English Medium Higher Secondary School, Perinthalmanna
Sree Valluvanad Vidyabhavan Senior Secondary School, Eravimangalam - Perinthalmanna
Tharakan Higher Secondary School, Angadipuram, Perithalmanna
St. Joseph's E.M. Senior Secondary School, Puthanangadi - Perinthalmanna
St. Mary's Higher Secondary School, Pariyapuram - Perinthalmanna
AM Higher Secondary School (AMHSS), Thirurkad
I.S.S. English Medium Senior Secondary School - Perinthalmanna
Anvar English Higher Secondary School, Thirurkad
Darul Uloom Higher Secondary School, Thootha
PTMHSS - Higher Secondary School, Thazhekode
GHSS - Higher Secondary School, Kunnakkavu
GHSS - Higher Secondary School, Anamangad
GHSS - Higher Secondary School, Aliparamba
GHSS - Higher Secondary School, Pulamanthole
Aura Global Schools, Panambi, Perinthalmanna (Affiliated to CBSE)
Darul Falah English School, Poopalam -  affiliated to the CBSE
Azhar English Medium School, Green Valley, Tirurkad
M.E.S. Central School, Perinthalmanna
MIC English Medium School, Cherukara
PES Global School (Parakkottil English School), Perintalmanna, Puzhakkattiri
Silvermount International School
JSS English Medium School Ponniakurissi
Sacred Heart CMI Public School Ponniakurissi
Royal Kids Montessori School, Kidangu Road Perinthalmanna
Casa Dei Bambini International Montessori Institute
P.K.M. School for mentally Retarded Children, Perinthalmanna
Fathima Upper Primary School Pariyapuram
Sarojini Memorial Upper Primary School, SMUPS - Perithalmanna
Kader Molla - KMMUPS Perinthalmanna South.
AUPS- Pathaikkara
AMUP School Poovathani   
AUP School Arakkuparamba, managed and owned by Kauthedath Mana family members.
PTMUP School. Puthanangadi

References

Perinthalmanna
Education in Malappuram district